This is the discography of American comedy duo Cheech & Chong.

Albums

Studio albums

Soundtrack albums

Compilation albums

Video albums

Singles

Notes

References

Discographies of American artists
Rock music group discographies